Tien Dung Kieu (born 25 October 1960) is an Australian physicist and former politician. He was a Labor Party member of the Victorian Legislative Council since 2018, representing South Eastern Metropolitan Region. He was defeated at the 2022 state election.

Kieu was born in Saigon, Vietnam in 1961. In 1979, he and his wife Liem left Vietnam as refugees on a boat to Malaysia, where they lived in a refugee camp until they were approached by Australian officials and offered passage and resettlement in Brisbane. Kieu worked as a labourer before enrolling at the University of Queensland, beginning an academic career in econophysics which took him to the University of Edinburgh and Oxford University, and then to the United States as a Fulbright scholar at Columbia, Princeton and MIT, before returning to Australia to work at Swinburne University of Technology in Melbourne.

References

1960 births
Living people
Australian Labor Party members of the Parliament of Victoria
Members of the Victorian Legislative Council
Australian physicists
University of Queensland alumni
Alumni of the University of Edinburgh
Academic staff of Swinburne University of Technology
Vietnamese refugees
Vietnamese emigrants to Australia
21st-century Australian politicians